Vitichi Municipality is the second municipal section of the Nor Chichas Province in the Potosí Department in Bolivia. Its seat is Vitichi.

Subdivision 
The municipality consists of the following cantons: 
 Ara
 Calcha
 Vitichi
 Yawisla

The people 
The people are predominantly indigenous citizens of Quechua descent.

References

External links 
Vitichi Municipality: population data and map

Municipalities of Potosí Department